Western Power may represent:

 Western Power (networks corporation), a crown corporation of Western Australia, founded in 2006 from part of Western Power Corporation. 
 Western Power Corporation, a crown corporation of Western Australia, founded in 1995 and reorganized in 2006 into Western Power and several other companies.  
  Western Power Distribution, an American-owned UK-based energy distributor.
 the economic, military or political power of Western Civilization

See also
 Western alliance
 Western bloc
 Western world